Saturday Night Live from Milano, Also known as Saturday Night Live Italy, was the Italian localization of the popular US-comedy television series Saturday Night Live, shown on Mediaset television channel Italia 1 from 2006 to 2011.

External links

2006 Italian television series debuts
2011 Italian television series endings
Mediaset
Italian comedy television series
Saturday Night Live
2000s Italian television series
Italia 1 original programming